Reliance is an unincorporated community in Polk County, Tennessee, United States. Reliance had a post office until it closed on May 21, 2011; it still has its own ZIP code, 37369.

History
Designated in 1986, the community is coexistent with the Reliance Historic District, listed on the National Register of Historic Places, which consists of the Vaughn-Webb House, Higdon Hotel, Watchman's House, and Hiwassee Union Church and Masonic Lodge.

The community developed in the latter 19th century when a water-powered grist mill and sawmill were constructed along the river. The railroad was constructed in the late 1880s, providing rail access to the Copper Basin. A ferry began operation in the center of the community east of the railroad around the same time. This ferry was replaced by a one-lane truss bridge in 1912; this bridge was subsequently replaced in 1992, and is now designated as part of SR 315.

A home constructed on the north side of the river in 1878 was expanded into the Higdon Hotel in 1890, initially providing housing for the railroad workers. It continued to operate until the 1930s when passenger trains through the area ceased. Constructed in 1888, the Vaughn-Webb House is a historic home which still remains. The Watchman's House, built in 1891 on the north side of the river, was originally occupied by a railroad watchman, whose job was to watch to ensure trains crossing the bridge over the Hiwassee did not set fire to the bridge. The Hiwassee Union Church and Masonic Lodge was constructed in the community in 1899, and also served as a school. A post office operated in the community between 1879 and 2003. It did not officially close until 2011.

References

Unincorporated communities in Polk County, Tennessee
Unincorporated communities in Tennessee
Populated places on the Hiwassee River
Historic districts on the National Register of Historic Places in Tennessee
National Register of Historic Places in Polk County, Tennessee